Universiti Malaysia Sabah (UMS, literally meaning, University of Malaysia of Sabah) is a public university in Malaysia. It was officially established on 24 November 1994 as the ninth public university in the country. The university is located on a 999-acre site at Sepanggar Bay in Kota Kinabalu in the Malaysian state of Sabah. With Mount Kinabalu and the South China Sea as its background, UMS is often considered as among the most beautiful campuses in Southeast Asia.

History 
In its early years of establishment, UMS operated from temporary borrowed facilities with the university's teaching and learning activities conducted at the Sabah Foundation Community College premises in Likas in 1995 and the Menggatal Telekom Training College in 1996. The initial UMS enrolment in 1995 was 205 students at undergraduate study level.   

From June 1999 to May 2000, UMS shifted in phases to its permanent campus at Sepanggar Bay. In January 1999, the university expanded its academic reach to the Federal Territory of Labuan with the establishment of the UMS Labuan International Campus (abbreviated as UMSKAL).

In the beginning, study programmes were offered by three schools - the School of Science and Technology, School of Business and Economics and School of Social Sciences – and the Centre for the Promotion of Knowledge and Language Learning, a liberal studies centre.

This number was subsequently expanded to include nine additional schools at the Kota Kinabalu campus namely the School of Engineering and Information Technology, School of Food Science and Nutrition, School of International Tropical Forestry, School of Education and Social Development, School of Psychology and Social Works, and School of Arts Studies. 

In F.T. Labuan, programmes were offered through the Labuan School of Informatics Science and School of Business and International Finance. By 2002, UMS had established 11 programmes of study.

In 2003, the number of schools was increased to 12 upon the setting up of the School of Medicine. This was followed by the establishment of the School of Sustainable Agriculture in 2006 which subsequently relocated five years later in 2011 to the UMS Sandakan Campus, its current location.

Other notable landmark initiatives by UMS were the setting up of the Preparatory Centre for Science and Technology in 2010 and the launching of the UMS Hospital (HUMS) building project targeted for completion by end 2022.

Seal
The seal of the university consists of a shield, an open book, a chevron, a Rafflesia flower and a circle.

The coat of arms in the seal is blazoned: Azure a chevron Or and in base a Rafflesia flower proper and a chief Gules an Open book proper.

Academic Expansion 
In conjunction with its 20th anniversary in June 2014, UMS embarked on a major academic transformation exercise whereby its 13 schools were restructured as 10 new faculties. UMS currently offers 115 academic study programmes at Foundation Science level (3), diploma level (6), undergraduate level (71), and at postgraduate diploma, masters and Doctor of Philosophy level (35).

List of Faculties 

 Faculty of Business, Economics and Accountancy (FPEP) – Kota Kinabalu 
 Faculty of Computing and Informatics (FKI) – Kota Kinabalu and W.P. Labuan  
 Faculty of Engineering (FKJ) – Kota Kinabalu
 Faculty of Food Science and Nutrition (FSMP) – Kota Kinabalu
 Faculty of Social Sciences and Humanities (FSSK) – Kota Kinabalu
 Faculty of Medicine and Health Sciences (FPSK) – Kota Kinabalu 
 Faculty of Psychology and Education (FPP) – Kota Kinabalu
 Faculty of Science and Natural Resources (FSSA) – Kota Kinabalu
 Faculty of Sustainable Agriculture (FPL) – Sandakan
 Labuan Faculty of International Finance (FKAL) – W.P. Labuan
 Faculty of Tropical Forestry (FPT) - Kota Kinabalu

List of Centres 

 Centre for the Promotion of Knowledge and Language Learning
 UMS Centre for External Education
 Preparatory Centre for Science and Technology
 Centre for Internationalisation and Global Engagement
 Centre for Career and Alumni 
 Centre for Co-Curriculum and Student Development
 Centre for E-Learning
 Centre for Investment, Endowment and Wakaf
 Centre for Occupational Safety and Health
 Centre for Postgraduate Studies
 Centre for Strategic Management and Corporate Communication 
 Centre for Teaching Excellence and Academic Quality
 Centre for Data and Information Management
 Centre for Instrumentation and Science Services
 Centre for Industrial Collaboration and Engagement
 EcoCampus Management Centre
 Minda Lestari Centre
 Centre for NR and Student Residential Facilities Management
 UMS Centre for Accounting 
 UMS Sports Centre
 Research and Innovation Management Centre
 Centre for Sustainable Society Engagement

List of Institutes 

 Biotechnology Research Institute
 Borneo Marine Research Institute 
 Institute for Tropical Biology and Conservation  
 Borneo Institute for Indigenous Studies

List of Departments, Offices and Divisions 

 Registrar's Office
 Bursar
 Library
 Chancellory Office
 Department of Information and Communication Technology 
 Development and Maintenance Department
 Legal Advisor Office
 Department of Student Affairs and Alumni
 UMS Hospital
 UMS Press
 Academic Services Division
 Internal Audit Department
 Security Division

List of Residential Colleges 

 Tun Mustapha Residential College – Kota Kinabalu
 Tun Fuad Residential College – Kota Kinabalu
 Tun Pengiran Ahmad Raffae Residential College – Kota Kinabalu
 Kingfisher International Residential College – Kota Kinabalu
 1Borneo Residential College – Kota Kinabalu
 UMSKAL Residential College - Labuan
 Lestari Residential College - Sandakan

Ranking 
QS World University Ranking 2021

#801-1000

QS Wur Ranking by Subject (Agriculture & Forestry) (2021)

#301-350

QS Asian University Ranking (2021)

#210

UI-Greenmetric World University Ranking

2019 – #58

2018 - #71

UI-Greenmetric Asia University Ranking (Asia)

2019 - #11

2018 - #17

UI-Greenmetric Asia University Ranking (Malaysia)

2019 - #3

2018 - #4

Gallery

References

External links

 Universiti Malaysia Sabah

 
Educational institutions established in 1994
1994 establishments in Malaysia